The 2022 Cassis Open Provence was a professional tennis tournament played on hard courts. It was the 4th edition of the tournament which was part of the 2022 ATP Challenger Tour. It took place in Cassis, France between 5 and 11 September 2022.

Singles main-draw entrants

Seeds

 1 Rankings are as of 29 August 2022.

Other entrants
The following players received wildcards into the singles main draw:
  Clément Chidekh
  Gabriel Debru
  Sascha Gueymard Wayenburg

The following players received entry into the singles main draw as alternates:
  Skander Mansouri
  Hiroki Moriya
  Clément Tabur

The following players received entry from the qualifying draw:
  Térence Atmane
  Thomaz Bellucci
  Robin Bertrand
  Kenny de Schepper
  Matteo Martineau
  Albano Olivetti

Champions

Singles

 Hugo Grenier def.  James Duckworth 7–5, 6–4.

Doubles

 Michael Geerts /  Joran Vliegen def.  Romain Arneodo /  Albano Olivetti 6–4, 7–6(8–6).

References

2022 ATP Challenger Tour
2022 in French sport
September 2022 sports events in France